Kowloon Central Post Office is the main post office in Kowloon, Hong Kong.

See also
 Hongkong Post
 Engineer's Office of the Former Pumping Station

References

Yau Ma Tei
Post office buildings in Hong Kong